Muhammad Fadhil bin Idris (born 29 July 1996) is a Malaysian professional footballer who plays as a central midfielder for Malaysia Super League club Perak.

Career statistics

Club

References

External links
 

1996 births
Living people
Malaysian footballers
Malaysia Premier League players
Malaysia Super League players
PKNP FC players
Perak F.C. players
Felda United F.C. players
Penang F.C. players
Melaka United F.C. players
Association football midfielders
People from Perak